Esmaeil is a given name. Notable people with the name include:

Esmaeil Bale (born 1985), Iranian footballer
Esmaeil Dousti, Iranian reformist politician, member of the City Council of Tehran
Esmaeil Ebadi (born 1976), Iranian archer who won the gold medal at the 2014 Asian Games
Esmaeil Elmkhah (8206–1988), Iranian featherweight weightlifter
Esmaeil Farhadi (born 1982), Iranian football player
Esmaeil Halali (born 1973), Iranian retired football player and manager of Mes Soongoun
Esmaeil Hosseini (born 1942), former Iranian cyclist
Esmaeil Jabbarzadeh (born 1960), Iranian reformist politician, former Governor of East Azerbaijan, Iran from 2013 to 2017
Esmaeil Khatib (born 1961), Iranian cleric and politician
Esmaeil Kousari (born 1955), Iranian military officer and conservative politician, currently the deputy chief of Sarallah Headquarters
Esmaeil Pashapour (born 1954), Iranian fencer
Esmaeil Sedigh, Iranian futsal coach and instructor based in the Philippines
Esmaeil Sharifat (born 1988), Iranian football player
Esmaeil Sohrabi, Iranian retired military officer and Chief-of-Staff of the Islamic Republic of Iran Army from 1984 to 1988
Seyed Esmaeil Mousavi Zanjani (1928–2002), Iranian Shiite cleric and politician

 Mid name
Mohammad Vahid Esmaeil Beigi (born 1992), Iranian football defender
Mohammad Esmaeil Saeidi (born 1961), Iranian retired Revolutionary Guards commander and politician affiliated with the Front of Islamic Revolution Stability
Mohammad Esmaeil Shooshtari (born 1949), minister of justice of the Islamic Republic of Iran for 1997–2005

See also
Hajj Esmaeil, a village in Bizaki Rural District, Golbajar District, Chenaran County, Razavi Khorasan Province, Iran
Emamzadeh Esmaeil and Isaiah mausoleum, historical complex in Isfahan, Iran, which dates back to the Seljuk and Safavid era